, also known as , is a public transportation company which operates local and long-distance buses in Mie prefecture, Japan. The company has other ventures, including a taxicab business and real estate. Mie Kotsu used to also own railway lines, but no longer operates in the rail transport sector – Mie Kotsu's former rail assets are now owned by Kintetsu Railway, its parent company.

References

External links
  

Bus companies of Japan